Nathan Konstandopoulos (born 26 June 1996) is an Australian footballer who plays as a central midfielder for Melbourne Victory in the A-League.

Club career
Konstandopoulos played for Adelaide United and was released. He trained for a week with Brisbane Roar and was approached by Josep Gombau to join his academy in New York. After playing a strong part in Brisbane Roar's NPL side during the 2016 NPL Queensland season, he signed a one-year scholarship contract with the senior side. On 2 June 2017, he returned to Adelaide United.

Konstandopoulos' brother, Kristin Konstandopoulos, is also a footballer. He currently plays for Adelaide Olympic.

References

External links
 

1996 births
Australian people of Greek descent
Australian soccer players
Soccer players from Adelaide
Association football midfielders
Adelaide United FC players
Brisbane Roar FC players
Melbourne Victory FC players
A-League Men players
Living people